Missouri Pettway (1902-1981) was an American artist. She is associated with the Gee's Bend quilting collective. In 2020, the National Gallery of Art acquired two of Missouri Pettway's quilts, along with work by other quilters from Gee's Bend. Her 1971 work titled "Path through the Woods" (Quiltmaker's Name) was featured in the Gallery's 2022 exhibition, Called to Create: Black Artist of the American South, September 18, 2022 – March 26, 2023, curated by Harry Cooper.

References 

1902 births
1981 deaths
American quilters